Finca 30 is a corregimiento in Bocas del Toro Province in the Republic of Panama.

References 

 

Populated places in Bocas del Toro Province